Batavia is an unincorporated community in Solano County, California, United States.

California Pacific Railroad station that was named around 1870 using the Latin name of The Netherlands.

References

Unincorporated communities in California
Unincorporated communities in Solano County, California